The 1929–30 League of Ireland was the ninth season of the League of Ireland. Shelbourne were the defending champions.

Bohemians won their third title.

Overview
No new teams were elected to the League.

Teams

Table

Results

Top goalscorers

See also 

 1929–30 FAI Cup

References

Ireland
Lea
League of Ireland seasons